The 5020 class are a class of diesel locomotive built by UGL Rail, Chullora for QR National in 2010-2011.

History
In February 2010, QR National ordered nineteen 5020 class locomotives to haul coal trains in the Hunter Valley. They are a heavy haul variant of the UGL Rail C44aci, with C44aci models being a medium weight, power improved version of the heavy haul UGL-GE C40aci Auruzon 5000 class.

References

Aurizon diesel locomotives
Co-Co locomotives
Diesel locomotives of New South Wales
Railway locomotives introduced in 2010
Standard gauge locomotives of Australia
Diesel-electric locomotives of Australia